Kathaleeya McIntosh (born November 10, 1972) is a Thai actress and television presenter, who was named as Princess of the entertainment industry. She was the lead actress in many Thai lakorns in the 1990s-2000s including Wanjai Thailand (“Sweet Darling of Thailand”), Khwamsongcham Mai Hua Jai Derm (“New Memory but Same Old Heart”), and Yak Yud Tawan Wai Thi Plai Fa (“Yearning to Stop the Sun at the Horizon”). She was also a television host in a popular talkshow, Samakhom Chomdao.

Early life and education 
McIntosh was born to a Scottish father and a Thai Chinese mother. She has an older brother, Willy McIntosh, who is also a well-known Thai actor. McIntosh started her modeling career when she was 15. She graduated from Assumption University with Bachelor of Arts majoring in English.

Filmography

Television 
 Peur Ter (Ch.5 1994)
 Yark Yood Tawan Wai Tee Plai Fah (Ch.5 1995)
 Ruen Mayura (Ch.3 1997)
 Rak Tae Kae Khob Fah (Ch.5 1997)
 Kwam Song Jum Mai Huajai Derm (Ch.5, 1998)
 Chai Mai Jing Ying Tae (Ch.3 1998)
 Kwam Song Jum Mai Huajai Derm (Ch.5, 1998)
 Dokkaew Karabuning (Ch.3, 2000)
 Kao Waan Hai Noo Pen Sai Lub (Ch.3, 2000)
 Muang Maya (Ch.5, 2000)
 Nee Ruk (Ch.5, 2001)
 Tok Kra Dai Hua Jai Ploy Jone (Ch.3, 2003)
 Wan Jai Thailand (Ch.3, 2004)
 Pluerk Sanae Ha (Ch.5, 2007)
 Trab Sin Dind Fah (Ch.5, 2008)
 Plub Plerng See Chompoo (Ch.3, 2015)
 Mueng Maya Live The Series (ONE HD, 2018)
 The Crown Princess (Ch.3 2018) cameo
 Wiman Cho Ngoen (ONE HD, 2018)
 In Family We Trust (ONE HD, 2018)
 Deja Vu (ONE HD, 2020)

Movies 
 Muang Maya The Movie: Songkram Nak Pun Rak (GDH 559, TBA) with Nusba Punnakantan & Lukkade Metinee Kingpayome

TV Show 

 Samakhom Chomdao
 Thailand's Got Talent (season 6)

Other works
Ambassador of Peace for Children and Youth of UNICEF, United Nations.
Assistant Sales Manager of Lucks (666) Company Ltd., Production of Saranae Show
Producer of Saranae Show, I SEE YOU, and almost every shows of Lucks 666.

Controversy
On September 2, 2005, McIntosh made front-page news in Thailand with an announcement that she was five months pregnant. This comes after repeated, and much publicised, previous denials.

It is believed by many that the controversy and negative attentions towards her were much attributed to the public perception that she had lied about her condition, rather than out-of-wedlock pregnancy. Her friends and family publicly berated the media because of their negative speculation of her ever expanding waistline when in September, 2005 her official pregnancy announcement was made. McIntosh maintained that she was previously unaware of her pregnancy of five months. The public reacted with disbelief. It also caused a rift between her and her cohost and close friend, who had berated the media in McIntosh's defence.

The cohost has been a longtime friend of the actress and had been by McIntosh's side as a host of Samakhom Chomdao since 1995. Surivipa Kultangwattana was unaware of McIntosh's conditions, and sincerely berated the media from her honest love and care for a friend. Surivipa, or NuMam was publicly banned for months after speaking rudely to reporters, but as soon as Surivipa found out about the announcement she was furious. She couldn't believe that her long-time friend would not have the heart to tell her in the hours prior to the public announcements. She, just like the others, found out from the news report. She then later calmed down and apologised to the media and reporters for her rude comments and confirmed that she was truly innocent.

In May 2006, she got married in Pran Buri, Prachuap Khiri Khan to Songkran Grachangnetara (Beebee), the father of her son.

References

External links
Fanpage

Kathaleeya McIntosh
Kathaleeya McIntosh
Kathaleeya McIntosh
1972 births
Living people
Kathaleeya McIntosh
Kathaleeya McIntosh
Kathaleeya McIntosh
Kathaleeya McIntosh
Kathaleeya McIntosh